Unicomp is a manufacturer of computer keyboards and keyboard accessories, based in Lexington, Kentucky, United States.

History
In 1996, Lexmark International was prepared to shut their Lexington keyboard factory where they produced Model M buckling-spring keyboards. IBM, their principal customer and the Model M's original designer and patent holder, had decided to remove the Model M from its product line in favor of cost-saving rubber-dome keyboards.

Rather than seeing its production come to an end, a group of former Lexmark and IBM employees purchased the license, tooling and design rights for buckling-spring technology, and, in April 1996, reestablished the business as Unicomp.

Since 1996, the tooling and molds that Unicomp had inherited from Lexmark began to wear out, leading to a gradual decline in build quality and finish. However, in 2020 Unicomp replaced its tooling leading to quality improvements. The company also began shipping new designs at this time.

Products

Unicomp's product line consists largely of modified designs based on late Model M keyboards produced by Lexmark.

The Classic 101 (formerly called the Customizer) is similar to one of IBM's late Model M variants and is built on the same tooling. The only changes to the Classic 101 compared to an original Model M are the logo, Windows keys, optional USB connectivity (as an alternative to PS/2), and the option for a black case with light gray or white keys (as an alternative to the classic "pearl" beige).

The Ultra Classic (formerly called the SpaceSaver) is a lighter, more compact version of the Classic. A variant of the Ultra Classic, still sold under its former name of SpaceSaver M, is designed for Macintosh computers.

The New Model M, a full-sized keyboard resembling an up-sized version of the Lexmark Space Saver design.

The Mini-M, a tenkeyless version with the lock lights moved from their traditional location above the now-absent numeric keypad to the top edge of the board above the F9-F12 keys.

The EnduraPro, is an Ultra Classic, except with a TrackPoint nub and 2 mouse buttons at the bottom inspired by the TrackPoints from ThinkPads.

The Classic Trackball, a Classic with a trackball and 2 mouse buttons right above the indicator lights. However, it is not currently being produced due to low demand.

The PC 122, a 122 key keyboard similar to the Classic, however with a rearranged layout and an extra set of function keys, and many keys moved to the left side of the keyboard, and the home key moved in the middle of the arrow keys.

Unicomp also offers a repair service along with replacement and custom parts for virtually all Model M and similar keyboards made by IBM, Lexmark, Maxi Switch, and Unicomp.

Gallery

See also 
 Keyboard technology
 List of mechanical keyboards

References

External links 

 
Review that includes company information
Unicomp featured on NPR

Companies established in 1996
Computer peripheral companies
Companies based in Lexington, Kentucky
Computer keyboard companies
Computer companies of the United States